John Wesley Johnson (born 22 March 1836-September 14, 1893) was a famous figure in the early development of Oregon's higher education. He is probably best known today as the first President of the University of Oregon, serving from 1876 to 1893.


Early years
In 1850, John Wesley Johnson and his family 
immigrated from Missouri to the Oregon Territory. Like many families who ventured West on the Oregon Trail, the Johnsons experienced many hardships. Johnson's mother and sister both died on the journey. A mere 14-years-old, Johnson was tasked with driving the family's team of oxen along the 2,000-mile trek to their new home in Corvallis, Oregon.

While growing up in Missouri, Johnson had no formal education and first learned to read and write at the age of 10. As a 17-year-old, Johnson first began attending school in Corvallis and was said to have excelled academically. Amongst his teachers, he had a reputation as a brilliant student, which allowed him to graduate early. The next year, he enrolled in Pacific University in Forest Grove. Johnson completed the college's available higher-level curriculum over the next two years (1854-1855) and then returned to Corvallis to serve as the first instructor and principal of Corvallis Academy (1856-1860). The academy, now known as Oregon State University, became one of the first forms of public higher education offered in the state.

To further his education, Johnson applied to Yale University. However, the cost to attend the prestigious school was too expensive and he alone did not have the means to pay for the education. At 24-years-old he secured a loan to cover his tuition and set out by ship for the Eastern Seaboard. The voyage took him South along the Pacific Coast to Panama, where he hiked 10 miles inland to board the newly constructed Isthmus of Panama Railroad. During the trip, he fell ill and later reported the physical cost of the trip was so severe he was unable to enlist as a soldier during the civil war. Upon reaching the Eastern shore, he voyaged North by ship to New York City. WIthin two years, Johnson received his law degree - ranking sixth out of 100 in his graduating class.

Johnson returned to Oregon, initially to practice law, in 1862. However, the demand for highly educated instructors and administrators at local colleges and universities was greater at the time. Johnson wound up serving as a teacher and administrator at McMinnville College (now Linfield College) from 1863 to 1867. He was eventually promoted to president. He left Linfield College to work as principal of Portland High School and remained there for six years. In 1873, Johnson was hired by the University of Oregon (known then as Oregon State University) as a Latin professor. On July 26, 1876, the University of Oregon Board of Regents met (immediately upon the state land board's official acceptance of Deady Hall) and elected Johnson the school's first president. Thomas Condon, Mary Spiller and Mark Bailey were also elected to the faculty that day.

University of Oregon
During his tenure at the University of Oregon, Johnson taught Greek and Latin. He served not only as president, but as registrar, business officer, provost, dean of students and secretary. His 17 years as president helped foster great expansion at the Eugene school, including the construction of Villard Hall in 1886 and the dormitory (now Friendly Hall) in 1893. Throughout his tenure, he was a statewide advocate of the university, attempting to overcome many Oregonians' objections to higher education.

Legacy
In 1918, the Administration Building (completed in 1915) was renamed Johnson Hall in honor of John Wesley Johnson. In 1985, the building was added to the National Register of Historic Places.

References

External links
 Official History Site - at the University of Oregon President's Office

Further reading

Yale University alumni
Presidents of the University of Oregon
Linfield University people
Oregon pioneers
1898 deaths
1836 births